William Bradfield Lane (November 2, 1916 – June 21, 1997) was an American professional basketball player. He played for the Detroit Eagles in the National Basketball League for three games during their 1940–41 season. After basketball he worked for a long time at Ford Motor Company.

References

1916 births
1997 deaths
American men's basketball players
United States Army Air Forces personnel of World War II
Basketball players from Detroit
Centers (basketball)
Detroit Eagles players
Forwards (basketball)
Michigan Wolverines men's basketball players